Leptotes mandersi is a butterfly in the family Lycaenidae first described by Hamilton Herbert Druce in 1907. It is endemic to Mauritius. The habitat consists of coastal areas.

The larvae feed on Caesalpinia bonduc.

References

Butterflies described in 1907
Leptotes (butterfly)